Osovo is a rural locality (a village) in Barvikhinskoye Rural Settlement of Odintsovsky District, in Moscow Oblast, Russia. Population: 

In the village there is the Osovo railway station and the estate Novo-Ogaryovo.

References 

Rural localities in Moscow Oblast